Frank Atkinson (19 March 1893 in Blackpool, Lancashire – 23 February 1963 in Pinner, Middlesex) was an English actor and writer.

He appeared in at least 130 films between 1930 and 1963. A stalwart of British films, often in small or uncredited roles, and also in Hollywood in the 1930s, notably in the Raoul Walsh directed Me and My Gal and Sailor's Luck. Allmovie described him as "tall and slender, and with gaunt facial features that lent themselves to looks of eccentricity, and with a highly cultured speaking voice, he could melt unobtrusively into a scene, as an anonymous bit-player, or could, with the utterance of a few words or a look, transform himself into a wryly comedic presence -- he played everything from jailers, guards, garage attendants, and soldiers to upper class twits."

He was the first person to play the scarecrow Worzel Gummidge on television in the original series, broadcast by the BBC on 10 February 1953.

Selected filmography
Actor

 Along Came Youth (1930) - Bit Role (uncredited)
 Ladies' Man (1931) - Valet
 Always Goodbye (1931) - Servant (uncredited)
 Ambassador Bill (1931) - American Embassy Valet (uncredited)
 The Menace (1932) - Man from Cartier's (uncredited)
 The Wet Parade (1932) - Barman At New Year Party (uncredited)
 Devil's Lottery (1932) - Summers the Butler (uncredited)
 The Woman in Room 13 (1932)
 The Man from Yesterday (1932) - British Soldier (uncredited)
 Skyscraper Souls (1932) - Waiter At Party (uncredited)
 The Man Called Back (1932) - Lower Level Court Clerk (uncredited)
 False Faces (1932) - Butler (uncredited)
 Sherlock Holmes (1932) - Man in Pub
 Call Her Savage (1932) - Stevens - Crosby's Valet (uncredited)
 For Me and My Gal (1932) - Ashley's Chum (uncredited)
 The Right to Live (1933) - Harry Woods
 Cavalcade (1933) - Uncle Dick (uncredited)
 Smoke Lightning (1933) - Alf Bailey
 Sailor's Luck (1933) - Swimming pool attendant (uncredited)
 Pleasure Cruise (1933) - Alf
 Life in the Raw (1933) - Picayune Cafe Patron (uncredited)
 Paddy the Next Best Thing (1933) - Chemist (uncredited)
 My Lips Betray (1933) - Baptiste, Royal Valet (uncredited)
 Rolling in Money (1934) - Wiggins
 The Outcast (1934) - Bit Part (uncredited)
 The Path of Glory (1934) - Karl
 Freedom of the Seas (1934) - O'Hara
 The Great Defender (1934) - Pope
 The Third Clue (1934) - Lefty
 Road House (1934) - Magician
 The Man Who Knew Too Much (1934) - Policeman Shot Behind Mattress (uncredited)
 Barnacle Bill (1935) - Arthur Neal
 Death Drives Through (1935) - John 'Nigger' Larson
 Night Mail (1935) - (uncredited)
 Be Careful, Mr. Smith (1935)
 Look Up and Laugh (1935) - Debt Collector (uncredited)
 Me and Marlborough (1935) - Soldier (uncredited)
 No Monkey Business (1935) - Chauffeur (uncredited)
 Play Up the Band (1935) - Alf Ramsbottom
 The Morals of Marcus (1935) - Ship Steward
 A Woman Alone (1936) - Porter
 The Limping Man (1936) - Insp. Cable
 Skylarks (1936)
 Shipmates o' Mine (1936) - Oliver Bright
 The High Command (1937) - Corporal
 The Show Goes On (1937) - Actor at OHara's Agency (uncredited)
 Knights for a Day (1937) - Timothy Trout
 Oh, Mr Porter! (1937) - Irate Irishman in Barney's Bar (uncredited)
 Young and Innocent (1937) - Petrol Pump Attendant (uncredited)
 The Green Cockatoo (1937) - Protheroe - the Butler
 The Schooner Gang (1937) - Ben Worton
 A Romance in Flanders (1937) - Joe Stuggins
 Kicking the Moon Around (1938) - (uncredited)
 Pygmalion (1938) - Taxi-Driver
 I've Got a Horse (1938) - Bunker
 Over the Moon (1939) - Reporter (uncredited)
 Discoveries (1939) - Photographer
 The Body Vanished (1939) - Hobbleberry
 Where's That Fire? (1940) - Town Clerk (uncredited)
 The Stars Look Down (1940) - Miner
 Ten Days in Paris (1940) - Pierre
 Penn of Pennsylvania (1942) - (uncredited)
 Hard Steel (1942) - Dick Sefton
 Mrs. Miniver (1942) - Man in Tavern (uncredited)
 The Avengers (1942) - Drunk at Oslo Quayside (uncredited)
 They Flew Alone (1942) - Reporter in the Johnson's House (uncredited)
 Let the People Sing (1942) - Bit Role (uncredited)
 Asking for Trouble (1942) - Policeman (uncredited)
 Much Too Shy (1942) - Village Policeman (uncredited)
 The Great Mr. Handel (1942) - Permobble
 The Gentle Sex (1943) - Restaurant Customer (uncredited)
 Get Cracking (1943) - Station Master (uncredited)
 Bell-Bottom George (1944) - Harry (uncredited)
 On Approval (1944) - Hansom Cab Driver (uncredited)
 Give Us the Moon (1944) - (uncredited)
 He Snoops to Conquer (1945) - Joe (uncredited)
 Kiss the Bride Goodbye (1945) - (uncredited)
 Waterloo Road (1945) - George - Pub Barman (uncredited)
 Great Day (1945) - Man at gate (uncredited)
 The Voice Within (1946) - Farmer
 Wanted for Murder (1946) - Chip Shop Customer (uncredited)
 I See a Dark Stranger (1946) - Soldier in Pub (uncredited)
 Great Expectations (1946) - Mike
 The Last Load (1948) - Jenkins
 The Man in the White Suit (1951) - The Baker
 Time Bomb (1953) - Guard
 The Titfield Thunderbolt (1953) - Station Sergeant
 The Broken Horseshoe (1953) - Railway Ticket Clerk
 The Fake (1953) - Tate Gallery Attendant (uncredited)
 Stryker of the Yard (1953)
 Lease of Life (1954) - Verger
 The Green Carnation (1954) - Lift operator
 The Black Rider (1954) - Landlord
 The Love Match (1955) - Worktaker At Milford (uncredited)
 Before I Wake (1955) - Taxi driver
 Track the Man Down (1955) - George (uncredited)
 The Man Who Knew Too Much (1956) - Edgar, Taxidermist (uncredited)
 Wicked as They Come (1956) - Hotel Porter (uncredited)
 Reach for the Sky (1956) - Tullin (uncredited)
 Sailor Beware! (1956) - Chauffeur (uncredited)
 Circus Friends (1956) - Horace
 Three Men in a Boat (1956) - Lockkeeper (uncredited)
 Hour of Decision (1957) - Caretaker
 At the Stroke of Nine (1957) - Festival Hall Porter
 Cat Girl (1957) - Guard (uncredited)
 High Flight (1957) - Parker
 Just My Luck (1957) - Green (uncredited)
 Stormy Crossing (1958) - Night Porter
 Beyond This Place (1959) - Night Doorman
 Left Right and Centre (1959) - Railway Porter (uncredited)
 Trouble with Eve (1960) - Cabdriver
 The Two Faces of Dr. Jekyll (1960) - Groom (uncredited)
 Saturday Night and Sunday Morning (1960) - Tommy (uncredited)
 The Night We Got the Bird (1961) - Bald headed man
 The Kitchen (1961) - Alfred
 Murder at the Gallop (1963) - Hotel Night Porter (uncredited) (final film role)

Screenwriter
 Play Up the Band (1935)
 King of the Castle (1936)
 Not So Dusty (1936)
 ''Knights for a Day (1937)

References

External links

1893 births
1963 deaths
20th-century English male actors
British expatriate male actors in the United States
English male film actors
English male television actors
Male actors from Lancashire
People from Blackpool